Olivet University is a private Christian institution of biblical higher education located in Anza, California. It is accredited by the Association for Biblical Higher Education (ABHE) to award Certificates, Bachelor's, Master's, D. Min. and Ph.D. degrees.

History
Olivet Theological College and Seminary (OTCS) was founded in 2000, in Seoul, South Korea, where it was co-located with the Southern Cross College Korea Campus, by evangelical pastor David J. Jang, and in Los Angeles. Jang was a member of the faculty of Southern Cross College and the first director of its Korea campus. The bible college was intended to train the denomination’s ministers. OTCS eventually functioned more as a "seedbed" for mission, offering multiple study fields and distance learning to ministry-bound students.

By 2004, the seminary expanded and incorporated into a university comprising five colleges - Olivet Theological College & Seminary, Jubilee College of Music, Olivet College of Art & Design, Olivet College of Journalism, and Olivet Institute of Technology - in the institution’s new home in San Francisco. Ralph D. Winter advised Jang on the relocation and expansion plan, and later served as the honorary chairman of Olivet University. The university moved into the former University of California, Berkeley Downtown Extension Campus, near the Moscone Center in 2005. They also founded Olivet Business School, which offers MBA programs and opened extension sites in Nashville, TN (at 141 Belle Forest Circle), New York City (at 6 Barclay Street in Lower Manhattan), San Francisco (at 1025 Howard Street), and Washington, D.C. (at 1400 Eye Street NW).

Olivet's flagship college, Olivet Theological College & Seminary ("OTCS"), developed several major changes to accommodate the school’s diverse student body. It was broken into separate institutions, each offering different degree programs. These include: The Jubilee College of Music, Olivet Business School, Olivet Institute of Technology, Olivet School of Art & Design, Olivet School of Language Education, Olivet School of Media and Communication, and Olivet School of Language Education.

On 26 November 2018, the Manhattan District Attorney charged the University and three of its officials with money laundering, fraud, and conspiracy in connection with the investigation into IBT Media. The indictment alleged that the university and it officials overstated the university's financial health to lenders and created a fictional auditor to approve its financial statements, then laundered the money through affiliated companies.  On February 20, 2020, Olivet University pleaded guilty to one count of conspiracy and falsifying business records in an attempt to fraudulently obtain $35 million from lenders.   Olivet University, as part of the plea, must pay $1.25 million in forfeiture over the next two years. In 2022, a new probe, conducted by the federal government, is also investigating money laundering in addition to human and labor trafficking and visa fraud, a former senior official of the Department of Homeland Security (DHS) told Newsweek. The former official, who was briefed on the investigation, characterized it as "complex and significant." On June 30, the New York State Education Department officially ended Olivet's authorization to operate in the state citing that their failings "are part of a larger pattern of poor administration and addressing such problems only after being caught in a criminal conspiracy."

Tracy J. Davis was the university President. According to Olivet, Tracy Davis was Academic Dean until November 2021 and "currently holds no role in the university."

Campus and student life
Olivet University's main campus is located at 36401 Tripp Flats Road, in Anza, CA 92539. 

The university also has campuses at the following locations: 

 San Francisco, CA campus is located at 201 Seminary Dr, Mill Valley, CA 94941
 Washington, D.C. campus is located at 201 Rittenhouse St NW, Washington, DC 20011
 St. Louis, MO campus is located at 5341 Emerson Ave. St. Louis, MO 63120
 Nashville, TN campus is located at 141 Belle Forest Circle Nashville, TN 37221
 Atlanta, GA campus is located at 953 Martin Luther King Jr. Dr. Atlanta,  GA 30314
 Chicago, IL campus is located at 3659 S. Honore St. Chicago, IL 60609

It formerly had two campuses in New York state:
 New York Dover, NY campus was located at 181 Hutchinson Ave, Wingdale, NY 12594
 New York Manhattan, NY campus was located at 6 Barclay Street, Floors 3-5, New York, NY 10007

Academics
Olivet University is divided into eight colleges: Jubilee College of Music, Olivet Business School, Olivet Institute of Technology, Olivet School of Art & Design, Olivet School of Language Education, Olivet School of Media & Communication, Olivet Theological College & Seminary, and Zinzendorf School of Doctoral Studies. The university is approved by the BPPE (Bureau for Private Postsecondary Education) to grant bachelors, master’s, and doctoral degrees, and certificates.

Ralph D. Winter Library
In July 2007, the Ralph D. Winter Library was named for missiologist and Olivet University Honorary Chairman, the late Ralph D. Winter. The library currently features 150,000 physical and electronic items for Biblical higher education and research, and is a repository for academic and theological resources in multiple formats and languages in service for world mission. Its collection of educational resources are distributed throughout the University’s main library, the William L. Wagner Mission Library, the Asian library, and seven specialized libraries supporting Olivet‘s educational programs.

Link to IBT Media
IBT Media says it has an ongoing "working relationship" with Olivet University which includes the school's providing design assistance and computer resources, and IBT Media's providing internships for students. IBT characterizes this relationship as similar to those Silicon Valley companies have with local universities. However, publication Christianity Today alleges that IBT Media has a close relationship both with Olivet and with its founder, controversial evangelical pastor David J. Jang. It claims that Jang is an investor in and has exercised control over IBT Media, that Davis was formerly director of journalism at Olivet, and that Uzac was its treasurer, at least at one time. Executives characterize the relationship as being between the institutions and not the founders, and that it is purely operational. Additionally, students of Olivet worked for IBT Media in the early days of the International Business Times.

Tracy Davis' husband, Johnathan Davis, is the CEO of IBT Media, a co-owner of Newsweek, and another follower of Jang.

References

External links

Universities and colleges in San Francisco
Evangelicalism in California
Presbyterian universities and colleges in the United States
2000 establishments in South Korea
IBT Media